Zhao Gang (born June 1968) is a Chinese executive and politician, currently serving as governor of Shaanxi.

He is a representative of the 20th National Congress of the Chinese Communist Party and a member of the 20th Central Committee of the Chinese Communist Party.

Biography
Zhao was born in Xinmin County, Liaoning, in June 1968. In 1986, he entered Beijing Institute of Technology, where he majored in electronic precision machinery. He joined the Chinese Communist Party (CCP) in June 1987.

After graduating in April 1993, Zhao was despatched to Norinco, where he was promoted to vice president in April 2004 and to president in December 2007. He was assistant general manager in September 2010 and subsequently deputy general manager in September 2013. 

In September 2017, Zhao was made general manager and deputy party secretary of CFHI Group Corporation Limited, having held the position for only a year.

Zhao was appointed vice governor of Shaanxi in October 2018, concurrently serving as party secretary of Yan'an since January 2021. In January 2021, he was also admitted to member of the Standing Committee of the CCP Shaanxi Provincial Committee, the province's top authority. In May 2022, he was appointed deputy party secretary of Shaanxi after Hu Henghua was selected as mayor of Chongqing. On 1 December 2022, he was appointed to concurrently serve as governor of Shaanxi.

References

1968 births
Living people
People from Xinmin
Governors of Shaanxi
Beijing Institute of Technology alumni
People's Republic of China politicians from Liaoning
Chinese Communist Party politicians from Liaoning
Members of the 20th Central Committee of the Chinese Communist Party